Upton may refer to:

Places

United Kingdom

England
 Upton, Slough, Berkshire (in Buckinghamshire until 1974)
 Upton, Buckinghamshire, a hamlet near Aylesbury
 Upton, Huntingdonshire, Cambridgeshire
 Upton, Peterborough, Cambridgeshire
 Upton, Halton, a location in Cheshire
 Upton-by-Chester, Cheshire
 Upton, Cornwall, Linkinhorne
 Upton, Bude–Stratton, a location in Cornwall
 Upton, Cumbria
 Upton, East Devon
 Upton, South Hams, Devon
 Upton, Torquay, Devon
 Upton Hellions, Devon
 Upton Pyne, Devon
 Upton, Dorset
 Upton, East Riding of Yorkshire, a location
 Tetbury Upton, Gloucestershire, former name Upton
 Hawkesbury Upton, Gloucestershire
 Upton Cheyney, Gloucestershire
  Upton, north Test Valley, Hampshire, a hamlet approximately 7 miles north of Andover
 Upton, south Test Valley, Hampshire, a hamlet near Southampton, towards the northern end of the M271 motorway
 Upton Grey, Hampshire, a village and civil parish near Basingstoke
 Upton, Isle of Wight, a location
 Upton, Thanet, a location in Broadstairs, Kent
 Upton, Leicestershire
 Upton, Lincolnshire
  Upton, Bexley, London
 Upton, Newham, in the London Borough of Newham
 Upton (UK Parliament constituency)
 Upton, Merseyside
 Upton, Norfolk
 Upton Fen, Norfolk
 Upton, Northamptonshire
  Upton, Bassetlaw, Nottinghamshire
 Upton, Newark and Sherwood, Nottinghamshire
  Upton, Vale of White Horse, Oxfordshire (in Berkshire until 1974)
 Upton, West Oxfordshire, Oxfordshire
 Upton Magna, Shropshire
 Upton, Somerset, Somerset West and Taunton
 Upton, South Somerset, a location in Somerset
 Upton Noble, Somerset
 Upton, Warwickshire
 Upton, West Yorkshire
 Upton, Wiltshire, near East Knoyle
 Upton Lovell, Wiltshire
 Upton Scudamore, Wiltshire
 Upton-upon-Severn, Worcestershire

Wales
 Upton, Pembrokeshire

United States
 Upton, Indiana
 Upton, Kentucky
 Upton, Maine
 Upton, Baltimore, Maryland, a neighborhood
 Upton (Baltimore, Maryland), a historic house
 Upton, Massachusetts, a New England town
 Upton (CDP), Massachusetts, the main village in the town
 Upton, Missouri
 Upton, New York, home of Brookhaven National Laboratory
 Upton County, Texas
 Upton, Wyoming

Elsewhere
 Upton, Cork, Ireland
 Upton, Quebec, Canada

Other uses
 Upton (name), including a list of people with the name
 Upton (automobile), an American car produced 1904–1907

See also
 Upton station (disambiguation)
 Upton House (disambiguation)
 Upton Park (disambiguation)